Joseph Barnes (died 1829) was a merchant and slave-owner in Jamaica. He was elected to the House of Assembly of Jamaica in 1820.

References 

Members of the House of Assembly of Jamaica
1829 deaths
Year of birth missing
Jamaican landowners
British slave owners
18th-century British businesspeople
19th-century British businesspeople
18th-century Jamaican people
19th-century Jamaican judges
Aldermen of Jamaica
Mayors of Kingston, Jamaica